James Waddell Alexander II (September 19, 1888 September 23, 1971) was a mathematician and topologist of the pre-World War II era and part of an influential Princeton topology elite, which included Oswald Veblen, Solomon Lefschetz, and others.  He was one of the first members of the Institute for Advanced Study (1933–1951), and also a professor at Princeton University (1920–1951).

Early life, family, and personal life
James was born on September 19, 1888, in Sea Bright, New Jersey. Alexander came from an old, distinguished Princeton family.  He was the only child of the American portrait painter John White Alexander and Elizabeth Alexander.  His maternal grandfather, James Waddell Alexander, was the president of the Equitable Life Assurance Society.  Alexander's affluence and upbringing allowed him to interact with high society in America and elsewhere.

He married Natalia Levitzkaja on January 11, 1918, a Russian woman.  Together, they had two children.

They would frequently spend time, until 1937, in the Chamonix area of France, where he would also climb mountains and hills.  Alexander was also a noted mountaineer, having succeeded in many major ascents, e.g. in the Swiss Alps and Colorado Rockies.  When in Princeton, he liked to climb the university buildings, and always left his office window on the top floor of Fine Hall open so that he could enter by climbing the building.

Education
He graduated from Princeton University with a Bachelor of Science degree in 1910.  He received his Masters of Arts degree in 1911 and his doctoral degree in 1915.

Military career
During World War I, Alexander served with tech staff in the Ordnance Department of the United States Army overseas.  He retired as a Captain.

Academic career
He was a pioneer in algebraic topology, setting the foundations for Henri Poincaré's ideas on homology theory and furthering it by founding cohomology theory, which developed gradually in the decade after he gave a definition of cochain.  For this, in 1928 he was awarded the Bôcher Memorial Prize.  He also contributed to the beginnings of knot theory by inventing the Alexander invariant of a knot, which in modern terms is a graded module obtained from the homology of a "cyclic covering" of the knot complement. From this invariant, he defined the first of the polynomial knot invariants.

With Garland Briggs, he also gave a combinatorial description of knot invariance based on certain moves, now (against the history) called the Reidemeister moves; and also a means of computing homological invariants from the knot diagram.

Towards the end of his life, Alexander became a recluse.  He was known as a socialist and his prominence brought him to the attention of McCarthyists.  The atmosphere of the McCarthy era pushed him into a greater seclusion.  He was not seen in public after 1954, when he appeared to sign a letter supporting J. Robert Oppenheimer.

Death and legacy
He died on September 23, 1971.

The Alexander's Chimney, in the Rocky Mountain National Park, is named after him.

See also
 Alexander horned sphere
 Alexander polynomial
 Alexander cochain
 Alexander–Spanier cohomology
 Alexander duality
 Alexander's trick

References

Sources
 James, I. M., Portrait of Alexander (1888–1971), Bull. Amer. Math. Soc. (N.S.)  38  (2001),  no. 2, 123–129.
 Cohen, Leon W., James Waddell Alexander (1888–1971), Bull. Amer. Math. Soc.  79  (1973), no. 5, 900—903.

External links

Author profile in the database zbMATH

1888 births
1971 deaths
20th-century American mathematicians
Topologists
Institute for Advanced Study faculty
Princeton University faculty
People from Sea Bright, New Jersey
Princeton University alumni
Mathematicians from New Jersey